GENDEX (GENealogical inDEX) File is a specification to export the index of a genealogical home page to a global name index service. It was developed by Eugene W. Stark as a feature of his GEDCOM to HTML translator software, GED2HTML. Stark's GENDEX site originally accepted the GENDEX files until that site was retired in 2004. Since then, other sites have continued to support the format, including the GenDex Network, which became publicly available on 4 April 2013. The GenDex Network is the direct successor to the TNG Network created by Darrin Lythgoe and is based in part on the code used in the TNG Network.

Format 

Each line in a GENDEX file represents the reference to a person record. Each GENDEX record has the following fields, each terminated by a '|' character:

Reference|SURNAME|given name /SURNAME/|date of birth|place of birth|date of death|place of death|

 Field 1: file name of web page referring to the individual
 Field 2: surname of the individual
 Field 3: full name of the individual
 Field 4: date of birth or christening (optional)
 Field 5: place of birth or christening (optional)
 Field 6: date of death or burial (optional)
 Field 7: place of death or burial (optional)

The full name field and the date fields have the format as it appears in the GEDCOM NAME and DATE record.

Example 

E.g. the URL to a genealogical person record is http://domain.com/index.php?individual=I0001.
The first part including the '=' is the static base URL, which is constant for each person record. The  'I0001'  is the variable part, which refers each individual.
The GENDEX file could look like this:

 I0001|MILLER|Jhon A. /MILLER/|30 JUN 1899|Berlin|20 SEP 1905|Hamburg|
 I0002|SMITH|Ann /SMITH/||England|||
 ...

References

External links 

 GenDex Network: GenDex GENealogical inDEX
 GenDex Network: GenDex registration
 GenDex Network: GenDex Advanced Search
 What is a GENDEX file? FAQ at FamilyTreeSeeker.com
 FamilyTreeSeeker.com: GENDEX search
 FamilyTreeSeeker.com: GENDEX file registration

Computer file formats
Genealogy software